Ajonpää and Kallanpää were bought from Denmark during the Continuation War and were intended for clearing influence mines. Both ships survived the wars, Ajonpää was retired 1960 and Kallanpää on 1962.

References

Minesweepers of the Finnish Navy
Mine warfare vessel classes
Ships built in Denmark